Samuel Boddington (19 June 1766 – 19 April 1843) was an Irish politician.  He was a Member of Parliament (MP)  for Tralee from January 1807 to May of the same year.
The Boddington family held large estates in the West Indies and Samuel had been left a fortune by his father who had been a director of the South Sea Company as well as a West India merchant with offices at Mark Lane.
In 1792 Samuel fell in love with a penniless orphan, Grace Ashburner, and in 1792 they were married. But Grace soon tired of her husband's quiet intellectual interests (Henry Fox rather unkindly referred to Samuel Boddington as "the arch-bore old Bod.") and eventually she eloped with his cousin Benjamin Boddington who had recently joined the family firm. Thereafter, Samuel approached his friend, Richard Sharp (politician), a fellow Dissenter, fellow member of the Fishmongers' Company, and both mutual friends of Samuel Rogers, asking if he would join him in business, and eventually a West India company of Boddington, Sharp and Philips (Sir George Philips, 1st Baronet) was established at 17 Mark Lane. Both Boddington and Philips (later Sir George Philips) followed Sharp's example and became dissenting Whig members of Parliament.

References

External links
 

 

1766 births
1843 deaths
Irish slave owners
West Indies merchants
Members of the Parliament of the United Kingdom for County Kerry constituencies (1801–1922)
UK MPs 1806–1807